Enemy Swim Lake is a lake in the glacial lake region of northeastern South Dakota located on the Lake Traverse Indian Reservation in Day County, United States.

Enemy Swim Lake's name is an accurate preservation of its native Sioux name, recalling an incident when Native Americans had to swim across the lake to escape their enemy.

See also
 List of lakes in South Dakota

Notes

Sources 
Fishing Works
Business Directory
South Dakota Glacial Lakes

Lakes of Day County, South Dakota
Lakes of South Dakota